Tottijärvi is a village and a former municipality in Nokia, Finland. It is located by the lake Pyhäjärvi, about 30 kilometres southwest of the city of Tampere. The population of Tottijärvi is 717 (2008).

History 
The history of Tottijärvi dates back to the early 14th century. According to a legend, it was named after the dog of the chieftain Matti Kurki. Kurki drowned his dog Totti into a lake, as it was making noise during an ambush and later the dog began to haunt him. The Tottijärvi Manor was established in 1416. It was owned by the Kurki of Laukko family. The manor was destroyed in the 1918 Finnish Civil War.

Tottijärvi was originally a part of the Greater Pirkkala, which was one of the 10 original sockens of the historical province of Satakunta, and later a part of the Vesilahti municipality. The Tottijärvi parish was established in 1685 and the municipality of Tottijärvi in 1906. It was annexed with the town of Nokia in 1976.

References 

Villages in Finland
Former municipalities of Finland
Nokia, Finland